A frigate is a type of warship. In different eras, the roles and capabilities of ships classified as frigates have varied somewhat.

The name frigate in the 17th to early 18th centuries was given to any full-rigged ship built for speed and maneuverability, intended to be used in scouting, escort and patrol roles. The term was applied loosely to ships varying greatly in design. In the second quarter of the 18th century, the 'true frigate' was developed in France. This type of vessel was characterised by possessing only one armed deck, with an unarmed deck below it used for berthing the crew.

Late in the 19th century (British and French prototypes were constructed in 1858), armoured frigates were developed as powerful ironclad warships, the term frigate was used because of their single gun deck. Later developments in ironclad ships rendered the frigate designation obsolete and the term fell out of favour.

During the Second World War the name 'frigate' was reintroduced to describe a seagoing escort ship intermediate in size between a corvette and a destroyer. After World War II, a wide variety of ships have been classified as frigates. Often there has been little consistency in usage. While some navies have regarded frigates as principally large ocean-going anti-submarine warfare (ASW) combatants, others have used the term to describe ships that are otherwise recognisable as corvettes, destroyers, and even nuclear-powered guided-missile cruisers. Some European navies use the term "frigate" for both their destroyers and frigates. The rank "frigate captain" derives from the name of this type of ship.

Age of sail

Origins
The term "frigate" (Italian: fregata; Dutch: fregat; Spanish/Catalan/Portuguese/Sicilian: fragata; French: frégate) originated in the Mediterranean in the late 15th century, referring to a lighter galley-type warship with oars, sails and a light armament, built for speed and maneuverability.

The etymology of the word remains uncertain, although it may have originated as a corruption of aphractus, a Latin word for an open vessel with no lower deck. Aphractus, in turn, derived from the Ancient Greek phrase ἄφρακτος ναῦς (aphraktos naus) – "undefended ship". In 1583, during the Eighty Years' War of 1568–1648, Habsburg Spain recovered the southern Netherlands from the Protestant rebels. This soon resulted in the use of the occupied ports as bases for privateers, the "Dunkirkers", to attack the shipping of the Dutch and their allies. To achieve this the Dunkirkers developed small, maneuverable, sailing vessels that came to be referred to as frigates. The success of these Dunkirker vessels influenced the ship design of other navies contending with them, but because most regular navies required ships of greater endurance than the Dunkirker frigates could provide, the term soon came to apply less exclusively to any relatively fast and elegant sail-only warship. In French, the term "frigate" gave rise to a verb – frégater, meaning 'to build long and low', and to an adjective, adding more confusion. Even the huge English  could be described as "a delicate frigate" by a contemporary after her upper decks were reduced in 1651.

The navy of the Dutch Republic became the first navy to build the larger ocean-going frigates. The Dutch navy had three principal tasks in the struggle against Spain: to protect Dutch merchant ships at sea, to blockade the ports of Spanish-held Flanders to damage trade and halt enemy privateering, and to fight the Spanish fleet and prevent troop landings. The first two tasks required speed, shallowness of draft for the shallow waters around the Netherlands, and the ability to carry sufficient supplies to maintain a blockade. The third task required heavy armament, sufficient to stand up to the Spanish fleet. The first of the larger battle-capable frigates were built around 1600 at Hoorn in Holland. By the later stages of the Eighty Years' War the Dutch had switched entirely from the heavier ships still used by the English and Spanish to the lighter frigates, carrying around 40 guns and weighing around 300 tons.

The effectiveness of the Dutch frigates became most evident in the Battle of the Downs in 1639, encouraging most other navies, especially the English, to adopt similar designs.

The fleets built by the Commonwealth of England in the 1650s generally consisted of ships described as "frigates", the largest of which were two-decker "great frigates" of the third rate. Carrying 60 guns, these vessels were as big and capable as "great ships" of the time; however, most other frigates at the time were used as "cruisers": independent fast ships. The term "frigate" implied a long hull-design, which relates directly to speed (see hull speed) and which also, in turn, helped the development of the broadside tactic in naval warfare.

Under the rating system of the Royal Navy, by the middle of the 18th century, the term "frigate" was technically restricted to single-decked ships of the fifth rate, though small 28-gun frigates classed as sixth rate.

Classic design

The classic sailing frigate, or 'true frigate', well-known today for its role in the Napoleonic Wars, can be traced back to French developments in the second quarter of the 18th century. The French-built  of 1740 is often regarded as the first example of this type. These ships were square-rigged and carried all their main guns on a single continuous upper deck. The lower deck, known as the "gun deck", now carried no armament, and functioned as a "berth deck" where the crew lived, and was in fact placed below the waterline of the new frigates. The typical earlier cruiser had a partially armed lower deck, from which it was known as a 'half-battery' or demi-batterie ship. Removing the guns from this deck allowed the height of the hull upperworks to be lowered, giving the resulting 'true-frigate' much improved sailing qualities. The unarmed deck meant that the frigate's guns were carried comparatively high above the waterline; as a result, when seas were too rough for two-deckers to open their lower deck gunports, frigates were still able to fight with all their guns (see the action of 13 January 1797, for an example when this was decisive).

The Royal Navy captured a number of the new French frigates, including Médée, during the War of the Austrian Succession (1740–1748) and were impressed by them, particularly for their inshore handling capabilities. They soon built copies (ordered in 1747), based on a French privateer named Tygre, and started to adapt the type to their own needs, setting the standard for other frigates as the leading naval power. The first British frigates carried 28 guns including an upper deck battery of twenty-four 9-pounder guns (the remaining four smaller guns were carried on the quarterdeck) but soon developed into fifth-rate ships of 32 or 36 guns including an upper deck battery of twenty-six 12-pounder guns, with the remaining six or ten smaller guns carried on the quarterdeck and forecastle. Technically, 'rated ships' with fewer than 28 guns could not be classed as frigates but as "post ships"; however, in common parlance most post ships were often described as "frigates", the same casual misuse of the term being extended to smaller two-decked ships that were too small to stand in the line of battle.

Heavy frigate

In 1778, the British Admiralty introduced a larger "heavy" frigate, with a main battery of twenty-six or twenty-eight 18-pounder guns (with smaller guns carried on the quarterdeck and forecastle). This move may reflect the naval conditions at the time, with both France and Spain as enemies the usual British preponderance in ship numbers was no longer the case and there was pressure on the British to produce cruisers of individually greater force. In reply, the first French 18-pounder frigates were laid down in 1781. The 18-pounder frigate eventually became the standard frigate of the French Revolutionary and Napoleonic Wars. The British produced larger, 38-gun, and slightly smaller, 36-gun, versions and also a 32-gun design that can be considered an 'economy version'. The 32-gun frigates also had the advantage that they could be built by the many smaller, less-specialised shipbuilders.

Frigates could (and usually did) additionally carry smaller carriage-mounted guns on their quarterdecks and forecastles (the superstructures above the upper deck). In 1778 the Carron Iron Company of Scotland produced a naval gun which would revolutionise the armament of smaller naval vessels, including the frigate. The carronade was a large calibre, short-barrelled naval cannon which was light, quick to reload and needed a smaller crew than a conventional long gun. Due to its lightness it could be mounted on the forecastle and quarterdeck of frigates. It greatly increased the firepower, measured in weight of metal (the combined weight of all projectiles fired in one broadside), of these vessels. The disadvantages of the carronade were that it had a much shorter range and was less accurate than a long gun. The British quickly saw the advantages of the new weapon and soon employed it on a wide scale. The US Navy also copied the design soon after its appearance. The French and other nations eventually adopted variations of the weapon in succeeding decades. The typical heavy frigate had a main armament of 18-pounder long guns, plus 32-pounder carronades mounted on its upper decks.

Super-heavy frigates

The first 'super-heavy frigates', armed with 24-pounder long guns, were built by the naval architect F H Chapman for the Swedish navy in 1782. Because of a shortage of ships-of-the-line, the Swedes wanted these frigates, the Bellona class, to be able to stand in the battle line in an emergency. It is not known whether the French were seeking to produce very potent cruisers or merely to address stability problems in old ships. The British, alarmed by the prospect of these powerful heavy frigates, responded by rasée-ing three of the smaller 64-gun battleships, including , which went on to have a very successful career as a frigate.

In 1797, three of the United States Navy's first six major ships were rated as 44-gun frigates, which operationally carried fifty-six to sixty 24-pounder long guns and 32-pounder or 42-pounder carronades on two decks; they were exceptionally powerful. These ships were so large, at around 1,500 tons, and well-armed that they were often regarded as equal to ships of the line, and after a series of losses at the outbreak of the War of 1812, Royal Navy fighting instructions ordered British frigates (usually of 38 guns or less) to never engage the large American frigates at any less than a 2:1 advantage. , preserved as a museum ship by the US Navy, is the oldest commissioned warship afloat, and is a surviving example of a frigate from the Age of Sail. Joshua Humphreys proposed that only live oak, a tree that grew only in America, should be used to build these ships.

The British, wounded by repeated defeats in single-ship actions, responded to the success of the American 44s in three ways. They built a class of conventional 40-gun, 24-pounder armed frigates on the lines of Endymion. They cut down three old 74-gun Ships-of-the-Line into rasées, producing frigates with a 32-pounder main armament, supplemented by 42-pounder carronades. These had an armament that far exceeded the power of the American ships.

Role

Frigates were perhaps the hardest-worked of warship types during the Age of Sail. While smaller than a ship-of-the-line, they were formidable opponents for the large numbers of sloops and gunboats, not to mention privateers or merchantmen. Able to carry six months' stores, they had very long range; and vessels larger than frigates were considered too valuable to operate independently.

Frigates scouted for the fleet, went on commerce-raiding missions and patrols, and conveyed messages and dignitaries. Usually, frigates would fight in small numbers or singly against other frigates. They would avoid contact with ships-of-the-line; even in the midst of a fleet engagement it was bad etiquette for a ship of the line to fire on an enemy frigate which had not fired first. Frigates were involved in fleet battles, often as "repeating frigates". In the smoke and confusion of battle, signals made by the fleet commander, whose flagship might be in the thick of the fighting, might be missed by the other ships of the fleet. Frigates were therefore stationed to windward or leeward of the main line of battle, and had to maintain a clear line of sight to the commander's flagship. Signals from the flagship were then repeated by the frigates, which themselves standing out of the line and clear from the smoke and disorder of battle, could be more easily seen by the other ships of the fleet. If damage or loss of masts prevented the flagship from making clear conventional signals, the repeating frigates could interpret them and hoist their own in the correct manner, passing on the commander's instructions clearly.

For officers in the Royal Navy, a frigate was a desirable posting. Frigates often saw action, which meant a greater chance of glory, promotion, and prize money.

Unlike larger ships that were placed in ordinary, frigates were kept in service in peacetime as a cost-saving measure and to provide experience to frigate captains and officers which would be useful in wartime. Frigates could also carry marines for boarding enemy ships or for operations on shore; in 1832, the frigate  landed a party of 282 sailors and Marines ashore in the US Navy's first Sumatran expedition.

Frigates remained a crucial element of navies until the mid-19th century. The first ironclads were classified as "frigates" because of the number of guns they carried. However, terminology changed as iron and steam became the norm, and the role of the frigate was assumed first by the protected cruiser and then by the light cruiser.

Frigates are often the vessel of choice in historical naval novels due to their relative freedom compared to ships-of-the-line (kept for fleet actions) and smaller vessels (generally assigned to a home port and less widely ranging). For example, the Patrick O'Brian Aubrey–Maturin series, C. S. Forester's Horatio Hornblower series and Alexander Kent's Richard Bolitho series. The motion picture Master and Commander: The Far Side of the World features a reconstructed historic frigate, HMS Rose, to depict Aubrey's frigate HMS Surprise.

Age of steam

Vessels classed as frigates continued to play a great role in navies with the adoption of steam power in the 19th century. In the 1830s, navies experimented with large paddle steamers equipped with large guns mounted on one deck, which were termed "paddle frigates".

From the mid-1840s on, frigates which more closely resembled the traditional sailing frigate were built with steam engines and screw propellers. These "screw frigates", built first of wood and later of iron, continued to perform the traditional role of the frigate until late in the 19th century.

Armoured frigate
From 1859, armour was added to ships based on existing frigate and ship of the line designs. The additional weight of the armour on these first ironclad warships meant that they could have only one gun deck, and they were technically frigates, even though they were more powerful than existing ships-of-the-line and occupied the same strategic role. The phrase "armoured frigate" remained in use for some time to denote a sail-equipped, broadside-firing type of ironclad.

During the 1880s, as warship design shifted from iron to steel and cruising warships without sails started to appear, the term "frigate" fell out of use. Vessels with armoured sides were designated as "battleships" or "armoured cruisers", while "protected cruisers" only possessed an armoured deck, and unarmoured vessels, including frigates and sloops, were classified as "unprotected cruisers".

Modern era

World War II

Modern frigates are related to earlier frigates only by name. The term "frigate" was readopted during the Second World War by the British Royal Navy to describe an anti-submarine escort vessel that was larger than a corvette, while smaller than a destroyer. Equal in size and capability to the American destroyer escort, frigates are usually less expensive to build and maintain. Anti-submarine escorts had previously been classified as sloops by the Royal Navy, and the s of 1939–1945 were as large as the new types of frigate, and more heavily armed. 22 of these were reclassified as frigates after the war, as were the remaining 24 smaller s.

The frigate was introduced to remedy some of the shortcomings inherent in the  corvette design: limited armament, a hull form not suited to open-ocean work, a single shaft which limited speed and maneuverability, and a lack of range. The frigate was designed and built to the same mercantile construction standards (scantlings) as the corvette, allowing manufacture by yards unused to warship construction.

The frigate possessed less offensive firepower and speed than a destroyer, but such qualities were not required for anti-submarine warfare. Rather, the frigate was an austere and weatherly vessel suitable for mass-construction and fitted with the latest innovations in anti-submarine warfare. As the frigate was intended purely for convoy duties, and not to deploy with the fleet, it had limited range and speed.

It was not until the Royal Navy's  of 1944 that a British design classified as a "frigate" was produced for fleet use, although it still suffered from limited speed. These anti-aircraft frigates, built on incomplete  hulls, were similar to the United States Navy's destroyer escorts (DE), although the latter had greater speed and offensive armament to better suit them to fleet deployments. The destroyer escort concept came from design studies by the General Board of the United States Navy in 1940, as modified by requirements established by a British commission in 1941 prior to the American entry into the war, for deep-water escorts. The American-built destroyer escorts serving in the British Royal Navy were rated as Captain-class frigates. The U.S. Navy's two Canadian-built  and 96 British-influenced, American-built  frigates that followed originally were classified as "patrol gunboats" (PG) in the U.S. Navy but on 15 April 1943 were all reclassified as patrol frigates (PF).

Modern frigate

Guided-missile role

The introduction of the surface-to-air missile after World War II made relatively small ships effective for anti-aircraft warfare: the "guided-missile frigate". In the USN, these vessels were called "ocean escorts" and designated "DE" or "DEG" until 1975 – a holdover from the World War II destroyer escort or "DE". The Royal Canadian Navy and British Royal Navy maintained the use of the term "frigate"; likewise, the French Navy refers to missile-equipped ship, up to cruiser-sized ships (and es), by the name of "frégate", while smaller units are named aviso. The Soviet Navy used the term "guard-ship" (сторожевой корабль).

From the 1950s to the 1970s, the United States Navy commissioned ships classed as guided-missile frigates (hull classification symbol DLG or DLGN, literally meaning guided-missile destroyer leaders), which were actually anti-aircraft warfare cruisers built on destroyer-style hulls. These had one or two twin launchers per ship for the RIM-2 Terrier missile, upgraded to the RIM-67 Standard ER missile in the 1980s. This type of ship was intended primarily to defend aircraft carriers against anti-ship cruise missiles, augmenting and eventually replacing converted World War II cruisers (CAG/CLG/CG) in this role. The guided-missile frigates also had an anti-submarine capability that most of the World War II cruiser conversions lacked. These "frigates" were roughly mid-way in size between cruisers and destroyers. This was similar to the use of the term "frigate" during the age of sail during which it referred to a medium-sized warship, but it was inconsistent with conventions used by other contemporary navies which regarded frigates as being smaller than destroyers. During the 1975 ship reclassification, the large American frigates were redesignated as guided-missile cruisers or destroyers (CG/CGN/DDG), while ocean escorts (the American classification for ships smaller than destroyers, with hull symbol DE/DEG (destroyer escort)) such as the Knox-class were reclassified as frigates (FF/FFG), sometimes called "fast frigates". In the late 1970s, as a gradual successor to the Knox frigates, the US Navy introduced the 51-ship  guided-missile frigates (FFG), the last of which was decommissioned in 2015, although some serve in other navies. By 1995 the older guided-missile cruisers and destroyers were replaced by the s and s.

One of the most successful post-1945 designs was the British , which was used by several navies. Laid down in 1959, the Leander class was based on the previous Type 12 anti-submarine frigate but equipped for anti-aircraft use as well. They were used by the UK into the 1990s, at which point some were sold onto other navies. The Leander design, or improved versions of it, were licence-built for other navies as well.

Nearly all modern frigates are equipped with some form of offensive or defensive missiles, and as such are rated as guided-missile frigates (FFG). Improvements in surface-to-air missiles (e.g., the Eurosam Aster 15) allow modern guided-missile frigates to form the core of many modern navies and to be used as a fleet defence platform, without the need for specialised anti-air warfare frigates.

Modern destroyers and frigates have sufficient endurance and seaworthiness for long voyages and so are considered blue water vessels, while corvettes (even the largest ones capable of carrying an anti-submarine warfare helicopter) are typically deployed in coastal or littoral zones so are regarded as brown-water or green-water vessels. According to Dr. Sidharth Kaushal of the Royal United Services Institute for Defence and Security Studies, describing the difference between 21st century destroyers and frigates, the larger "destroyers can more easily carry and generate the power for more powerful high-resolution radar and a larger number of vertical launch cells. They can thus provide theatre wide air and missile defence for forces such as a carrier battle group and typically serve this function". By contrast the smaller "frigates are thus usually used as escort vessels to protect sea lines of communication or as an auxiliary component of a strike group". The largest and powerful destroyers are often classified as cruisers, such as the s, due to their extra armament and facilities to serve as fleet flagships.

Other uses
The Royal Navy Type 61 (Salisbury class) were "air direction" frigates equipped to track aircraft. To this end they had reduced armament compared to the Type 41 (Leopard-class) air-defence frigates built on the same hull.

Multi-role frigates like the MEKO 200,  and es are designed for navies needing warships deployed in a variety of situations that a general frigate class would not be able to fulfill and not requiring the need for deploying destroyers.

Anti-submarine role

At the opposite end of the spectrum, some frigates are specialised for anti-submarine warfare. Increasing submarine speeds towards the end of World War II (see German Type XXI submarine) greatly reduced the margin of speed superiority of frigate over submarine.

Such ships carry improved sonar equipment, such as the variable depth sonar or towed array, and specialised weapons such as torpedoes, forward-throwing weapons such as Limbo and missile-carried anti-submarine torpedoes such as ASROC or Ikara. The Royal Navy's original Type 22 frigate is an example of a specialised anti-submarine warfare frigate, though it also has Sea Wolf surface-to-air missiles for point defense plus Exocet surface-to-surface missiles for limited offensive capability.

Especially for anti-submarine warfare, most modern frigates have a landing deck and hangar aft to operate helicopters, eliminating the need for the frigate to close with unknown sub-surface threats, and using fast helicopters to attack nuclear submarines which may be faster than surface warships. For this task the helicopter is equipped with sensors such as sonobuoys, wire-mounted dipping sonar and magnetic anomaly detectors to identify possible threats, and torpedoes or depth-charges to attack them.

With their onboard radar helicopters can also be used to reconnoitre over-the-horizon targets and, if equipped with anti-ship missiles such as Penguin or Sea Skua, to attack them. The helicopter is also invaluable for search and rescue operation and has largely replaced the use of small boats or the jackstay rig for such duties as transferring personnel, mail and cargo between ships or to shore. With helicopters these tasks can be accomplished faster and less dangerously, and without the need for the frigate to slow down or change course.

Air defence role

Frigates designed in the 1960s and 1970s, such as the US Navy's , West Germany's , and Royal Navy's Type 22 frigate were equipped with a small number of short-ranged surface-to-air missiles (Sea Sparrow or Sea Wolf) for point defense only.

Recent examples include the  air defence and command frigate of the Royal Netherlands Navy. These ships are armed with VL Standard Missile 2 Block IIIA, one or two Goalkeeper CIWS systems, ( has two Goalkeepers, the rest of the ships have the capacity for another one.) VL Evolved Sea Sparrow Missiles, a special SMART-L radar and a Thales Active Phased Array Radar (APAR), all of which are for air defence.

Further developments

Stealth technology has been introduced in modern frigate design by the French  design. Frigate shapes are designed to offer a minimal radar cross section, which also lends them good air penetration; the maneuverability of these frigates has been compared to that of sailing ships. Examples are the Italian and French  with the Aster 15 and Aster 30 missile for anti-missile capabilities, the German  and s, the Turkish  type frigates with the MK-41 VLS, the Indian ,  and  classes with the Brahmos missile system and the Malaysian  with the Naval Strike Missile.

The modern French Navy applies the term first-class frigate and second-class frigate to both destroyers and frigates in service. Pennant numbers remain divided between F-series numbers for those ships internationally recognised as frigates and D-series pennant numbers for those more traditionally recognised as destroyers. This can result in some confusion as certain classes are referred to as frigates in French service while similar ships in other navies are referred to as destroyers. This also results in some recent classes of French ships such as the  being among the largest in the world to carry the rating of frigate.

The Frégates de Taille Intermédiaire (FTI), which means frigates of intermediate size, is a French military program to design and create a planned class of frigates to be used by the French Navy. At the moment, the program consists of five ships, with commissioning planned from 2023 onwards.

In the German Navy, frigates were used to replace aging destroyers; however in size and role the new German frigates exceed the former class of destroyers. The future German s are the largest class of frigates worldwide with a displacement of more than 7,200 tons. The same was done in the Spanish Navy, which went ahead with the deployment of the first Aegis frigates, the s.

Although the size of the Myanmar Navy is quite small, it is producing modern guided-missile frigates with the help of Russia, China, and India. However, the fleets of the Myanmar Navy are still expanding with several on-going shipbuilding programmes, including one , 4,000-tonne frigate with the vertical missile launch systems.

Littoral combat ship (LCS)

Some new classes of ships similar to corvettes are optimized for high-speed deployment and combat with small craft rather than combat between equal opponents; an example is the U.S. littoral combat ship (LCS). As of 2015, all s in the United States Navy have been decommissioned, and their role partially being assumed by the new LCS. A major advantage for the LCS ships is that they are designed around specific mission modules allowing them to fulfill a variety of roles. The modular system also allows for most upgrades to be performed ashore and installed later into the ship, keeping the ships available for deployment for the maximum time.

The latest U.S. deactivation plans mean that this is the first time that the U.S. Navy has been without a frigate class of ships since 1943 (technically  is rated as a frigate and is still in commission, but does not count towards Navy force levels).

The remaining 20 LCSs to be acquired from 2019 and onwards that will be enhanced will be designated as frigates, and existing ships given modifications may also have their classification changed to FF as well.

Frigates in preservation

A few frigates have survived as museum ships. They are:

Original sailing frigates
  in Boston, United States. Second oldest commissioned warship in the world, oldest commissioned warship afloat. Active as the flagship of the United States Navy.
 NRP Dom Fernando II e Glória in Almada, Portugal.
  in Hartlepool, England.
  in Dundee, Scotland.

Replica sailing frigates
 , sailing replica of the 1779 Hermione which carried Lafayette to the United States.
 , originally named Grand Turk was built for the TV series Hornblower in 1997. She was sold to France in 2010 and renamed Étoile du Roy.
 , a sailing replica of Russia's first warship, homeported in Saint Petersburg, Russia.
  in San Diego, United States, replica of HMS Rose, used in the film, Master and Commander: The Far Side of the World.

Steam frigates
  in Den Helder, Netherlands.
  in Ebeltoft, Denmark.
 , replica in Esashi, Japan.
  in Portsmouth, England.
  in Buenos Aires, Argentina.

Modern era frigates
  in Copenhagen, Denmark.
  in Brisbane, Australia.
 TCG Ege (F256), formerly  in Izmit, Turkey.
 ROKS Taedong (PF-63), formerly  in South Korea.
 ROKS Ulsan (FF-951), in Ulsan, South Korea.
 ROKS Seoul (FF-952), in Seoul, South Korea.
 HTMS Tachin (PF-1), formerly  in Nakhon Nayok, Thailand.
 HTMS Prasase (PF-2), formerly  in Rayong Province, Thailand.
 HTMS Phutthaloetla Naphalai in Sattahip, Thailand.
 HTMS Phutthayotfa Chulalok in Sattahip, Thailand.
 CNS Yintang (FFG-531) in Qingdao, China.
 CNS Xiamen (FFG-515) in Taizhou, China.
 CNS Ji'an (FFG-518) in Wuxue, China.
 CNS Siping (FFG-544) in Xingguo County, China
 CNS Jinhua (FFG-534) in Hengdian, China
 CNS Dangdong (FFG-543) in Dangdong, China
  in London, England.
  in London, England.
  in Glasgow, Scotland (planned)
  in Horten, Norway.
  in Lumut, Malaysia.
  in Yangon, Myanmar

Former museums
 Dominican frigate Mella was on display in the Dominican Republic from 1998 to 2003, when she was scrapped due to her deteriorating condition.
 KD Rahmat was on display in Lumut, Malaysia from 2011 to 2017. She sank at her moorings due to poor condition, and was later scrapped.
 RFS Druzhnyy was on display in Moscow, Russia from 2002 to 2016, until the museum plans fell through and was sold for scrap.
  was on display in Birkenhead, England from 1990 to 2006, when the museum that operated her was forced to close. She was later scrapped in 2012.
 CNS Nanchong (FF-502) was on display in Qingdao, China from 1988 to 2012, when her faulty material made preservation difficult and was later scrapped.

Operators
  operates three s, three Adhafer-class frigates, and two MEKO A-200AN frigates.
  operates six Espora-class frigates/corvettes. 
  operates eight s.
  operates a single .
  operates a single  donated from the United States.
  operates a single modified , two Jiangwei II class and two Jianghu III-class frigates purchased from China, and two Hamilton-class patrol frigates from the United States.
  operates two s purchased from The Netherlands.
  operates six s and one Type 22 frigate purchased from the United Kingdom.
  operates three s, purchased from Belgium, and a single .
  operates twelve s.
  operates three Type 23 frigates and a single Type 22 frigate, purchased from the United Kingdom, two s, purchased from Australia, and two , purchased from The Netherlands.
  operates 31 Jiangkai II-class frigates, two Jiangkai I-class frigates, seven Jiangwei II-class frigates, and six Jianghu-class frigates.
  operates three Jiangwei I-class frigates transferred from the navy. 
  operates 10 s, which are the Taiwanese variant of the US Oliver Hazard Perry class, six s, purchased from the United States, and six s, which are the Taiwanese variant of the French La Fayette class.
  operates four s.
  operates two s, converted from fishing trawlers.
  operates four Thetis-class frigates, three s and two s.
  operates two s purchased from Chile.
  operates one MEKO A-200EN frigate, two Bergamini-class frigates from Italy, one Aquitaine-class frigate from France, four s and two s purchased from the United States, and a Black Swan-class frigate used as training ship.
  operates a single -class frigate.
  operates five s and six s.
  operates four s, four s and three s with the latter sometimes classed as destroyers.
  operates nine s, purchased from the Netherlands and four s.
  operates three s, six s, and three s
  operates two s, five s, purchased from the Netherlands, and three Bung Tomo-class light frigates, purchased from the United Kingdom.
  operates four s and three s.
  operates ten Bergamini-class frigates, two Thaon di Revel-class patrol frigates, and four s.
  operates three s with more under construction and six Abukuma-class frigates.
  operates two s.
  operates six s, two s, and four s.
  operates a single .
  operates two s.
  operates four s purchased from the United States and a single Reformador-class frigate.
  operates one Aquitaine-class frigate, two s, ordered from France and three Tarik Ben Ziyad-class frigates.
  operates two s, one , and two Jianghu II-class frigates purchased from China.
  operates two s.
  operates two s.
  operates two Hamilton-class patrol frigates from the United States, a single Aradu-class frigate, though its operational status is doubtful, and a single Obuma-class frigate used as training hulk. 
  operates two s, four s and a single , purchased from the United States.
  operates seven s, with four being transferred from Italy.
  operates a single , transferred from the Navy.
  operates two s.
  operates two s, purchased from the United States.
  operates three s, and two s, purchased from the Netherlands.
  operates two Type 22 frigates, purchased from the United Kingdom.
  operates one Gremyashchiy-class frigates/corvettes, seven Steregushchiy-class frigates/corvettes, three s, two s, two s, two s, and two s.
  operates two s.
  operates three s, which are the Saudi variant of the French La Fayette class, and four s.
  operates six s, these are the Singapore variant of the French La Fayette class.
  operates four s, made in Germany based on the MEKO A200 design.
  Operates five s, these ships are the Spanish variant of the American Oliver Hazard Perry class.
  operates a single Jiangwei I-class frigate purchased from China.
  operates a single , though its operational status is doubtful. 
  operates eight s purchased from the United States, four s, and four s.
  operates 12 Type 23 anti-submarine frigates.
  operates a single , purchased from Portugal.
  operates six s, though only two are reported operational.
  operates five s and four s.

Disputed classes
These ships are classified by their respective nations as frigates, but are considered destroyers internationally due to size, armament, and role.

  operates three s and four s.
  operates four s.
  operates four s.
  operates five s.

Former operators

  decommissioned its last  in 1998.
  lost its entire fleet, including two s and the training frigate Ethiopia, following the independence of Eritrea in 1991. 
  decommissioned EML Admiral Pitka in 2013.
  decommissioned its last  in 1985.
  decommissioned all three s upon German Reunification in 1990.
  lost its only operational frigate Ibn Khaldoum which was sunk in 2003.
  decommissioned its last  in 1959.
  decommissioned both its Kotor-class frigates in 2019.
  transferred its two s to Montenegro upon their independence in 2006.
  decommissioned its last two Visby-class frigates in 1982, following defense reviews.
  operated a single  Hetman Sahaidachny which was scuttled in 2022.
  decommissioned its last  in 2015.
  transferred its six remaining Trần Quang Khải-class frigates to the Philippines following the Fall of Saigon in 1975. The seventh ship was captured by North Vietnam and recommissioned into the Vietnam People's Navy.

Future development

  has ordered three Steregushchiy-class frigates from Russia.
  has ordered nine s. These ships are the Australian variant of the Type 26 frigates, and will carry the AEGIS combat system.
  is planning to build two Anti-Submarine Warfare frigates to replace the current s. It is a joint project with the Netherlands.
  has ordered four s. These ships will replace Brazil's aging s. 
  plans to order 15 Type 26 frigates as the design for the Canadian Surface Combatant. These ships will replace the decommissioned s and s.
  is continuing to build Jiangkai II-class frigates.
  is planning to build 10–15 new frigates to replace the aging Knox class and Cheng Kung class.
  recently acquired two Bergamini-class frigates from Italy while still under construction. They will replace Egypt's two recently decommissioned Jianghu-class frigates.
  is planning to build four s. These vessels, despite their classification have been described as frigates by the Finnish defense ministry and lead to a debate over the classification in the Finnish Parliament.
  is currently planning to build four MKS 180 frigates to replace the s.
  is planning to build three Belharra-class frigates as a part of plans for replacing its aging s. There is an option for a fourth ship.
  will acquire three incomplete s from Russia. Russia was unable to finish the vessels due to their gas turbine engines being built in Ukraine. Ukraine refused to supply Russia with the engines following the 2014 Annexation of Crimea. India is also building seven s to replace the s.
  is currently building one Type 31 frigate with another one planned. Indonesia will also order six Bergamini-class frigates and two .
  is building 16 Thaon di Revel-class frigates. These vessels will replace the decommissioned s and s. Italy is also planning to commission two more Bergamini-class frigates.
  is currently building four more s. 
  is currently building four s. These ships will replace the s.
  is currently building six more s. These ships will replace the aging s.
  is currently building six s and currently planning for 12 ships for the class.
  will commission one more Reformador-class frigate.
  is planning to build two Anti-Submarine Warfare frigates to replace the current s. It is a joint project with Belgium.
  has ordered four Jiangkai II-class frigates from China. These ships will replace Pakistan's aging s.
  will build three Type 31 frigates to replacing its aging Oliver Hazard Perry-class frigates.
  is currently building eight more s and eighteen+ Steregushchiy/Gremyashchiy-class frigates/corvettes. Russia is also planning the construction of 12 Project 22350M frigates, known as the Super Gorshkov-class.
These ships are to replace the aging s.
  is currently planning to build five s. These ships will replace Spain's s.
  is currently building an additional . 
  is currently building the s as a part of the MILGEM project.
  is currently building four Volodymyr Velykyi-class frigates. These ships will help rebuild the Ukrainian Navy, which has been depleted since the capture of most of its navy following the 2014 Russian Annexation of Crimea. Additionally, the United States has offered to transfer two Oliver Hazard Perry-class frigates to Ukraine, the offer is still under consideration.
  is currently building eight Type 26 frigates. These ships, along with five planned Type 31 frigates will replace the Type 23 frigates currently in service. Additionally, five Type 32 frigates are also planned to supplement the Royal Navy's strength.
  is currently building 20 s. These ships are a variant of the FREMM multipurpose frigate and will replace the decommissioned Oliver Hazard Perry-class frigates. As of late 2022, only three guided-missile frigates have been announced.

See also
 Frigate 36, a sailboat design, named in honour of the warship class
 , a destroyer design officially named Project 1155 Fregat, which translates to frigate or frigatebird
 List of escorteurs of the French Navy
 List of frigate classes
 List of frigate classes by country
 List of frigates of World War II
 United States Navy 1975 ship reclassification

References

Citations

Sources 

 
 Bennett, G. (2001)The Battle of Trafalgar, Barnsley (2004). .
 Constam, Angus & Bryan, Tony, British Napoleonic Ship-Of-The-Line, Osprey Publishing, 184176308X
 
 
 
 
 
 
Lambert, Andrew (1984) Battleships in Transition, the Creation of the Steam Battlefleet 1815–1860, published Conway Maritime Press, .
 
Lavery, Brian. (1983) The Ship of the Line, Volume 1: The Development of the Battlefleet, 1650–1850. Annapolis, Md.: Naval Institute Press, .
Lavery, Brian. (1984) The Ship of the Line, Volume 2: Design, Construction and Fittings. Annapolis, Md.: Naval Institute Press, .
Lavery, B. (2004) Ship, Dorling Kindersly, Ltd . .
Mahan, A.T. (2007) The Influence of Sea Power Upon History 1660–1783, Cosimo, Inc.
Marriott, Leo. Royal Navy Frigates 1945–1983, Ian Allan, 1983, .
Macfarquhar, Colin & Gleig, George (eds.), ((1797)) Encyclopædia Britannica: Or, A Dictionary of Arts, Sciences, and Miscellaneous Literature, London, Volume 17, Third Edition.
 
Sondhaus, L. Naval Warfare, 1815–1914.
Winfield, Rif. (1997) The 50-Gun Ship. London: Caxton Editions, .

External links

Frigates from battleships-cruisers.co.uk – history and pictures of United Kingdom frigates since World War II
Frigates from Destroyers OnLine – pictures, history, crews of United States frigates since 1963
The Development of the Full-Rigged Ship From the Carrack to the Full-Rigger

Frigates
Ship types
Naval sailing ship types
Ship designs of the Dutch Republic